Əlikənd (also, Alikend and Alykend) is a village in the Goychay Rayon of Azerbaijan. The village forms part of the municipality of Mırtı.

References 

Populated places in Goychay District